Guillaume Malbecque ( 1400 – 29 August 1465 in Soignies) was a Flemish composer.
Malbecque may indicate his place of birth. He was an associate of Guillaume Dufay at Cambrai, a former singer in the papal chapel, and in his last years together with Gilles Binchois and Johannes Regis at Soignies.

Works
Surviving works in the Bodleian Library manuscript include:
 Adieu vous di, mes seigneurs et amis
 Quant de la belle me parti
 Dieu vous doinst bon jour

References

1400s births
1465 deaths
Renaissance composers
Year of birth uncertain
People from Soignies
Male classical composers